The Ninth Council of Ministers of Bosnia and Herzegovina (Bosnian and Croatian: Deveti saziv Vijeća ministara Bosne i Hercegovine) was the Council of Ministers of Bosnia and Herzegovina cabinet formed on 11 January 2007, following the 2006 general election. It was led by Chairman of the Council of Ministers Nikola Špirić. The cabinet was dissolved on 20 February 2008 and was succeeded by a new Council of Ministers presided over by Špirić.

History
The First Špirić cabinet was formed on 11 January 2007, following the 2006 general election. At the election, the Alliance of Independent Social Democrats (SNSD), of which Špirić is part of, won the most parliamentary seats in Republika Srpska, one of the two entities of Bosnia and Herzegovina, and the third most seats in the whole country with 46.9% of the vote. This secured the SNSD a part of a majority coalition government in the Council of Ministers.

Three months after the election, the new Council of Ministers was formed with Špirić presiding.

Ten months after the government's formation, on 1 November, Špirić tendered his resignation in protest of parliamentary reforms imposed by High Representative Miroslav Lajčák. Špirić felt that the reforms would reduce the influence of Bosnia's Serb population. The resignation was deemed by some to be the country's most serious crisis since the end of the Bosnian War. After the crisis was resolved, he was renominated for the chairman's post on 10 December 2007, confirmed by the Presidency on 27 December 2007 and by Parliament a day later, on 28 December. With Špirić's reappointment, a new cabinet presided by Špirić was officially formed in February 2008, but with little change.

Party breakdown
Party breakdown of cabinet ministers:

Cabinet members
The Cabinet was structured into the offices for the chairman of the Council of Ministers, the two vice chairs and 9 ministries.

References

External links
Website of the Council of Ministers

2007 establishments in Bosnia and Herzegovina
Cabinets established in 2007
2008 disestablishments in Bosnia and Herzegovina
Cabinets disestablished in 2008